Tyro Mill is a historic grist mill located at Tyro, Nelson County, Virginia. It is a multi-story frame mill built in 1846–47 with an addition made in the late nineteenth century. It has a metal-sheathed gable roof and a stone foundation. There is an overshot metal wheel in a stone wheel well and remnants of the head race.  The mill contains original machinery including wood gears and drive shafts, two runs of millstones, and a husk frame in the basement gear pit. Also on the property is a mid-19th century log dwelling—traditionally identified as the miller's house—with twentieth century frame additions and front porch.

It was listed on the National Register of Historic Places in 2006.

References

Grinding mills on the National Register of Historic Places in Virginia
National Register of Historic Places in Nelson County, Virginia
Buildings and structures in Nelson County, Virginia
Industrial buildings completed in 1847
Grinding mills in Virginia
1847 establishments in Virginia